Quicksand is an album by American trumpeter Ted Curson which was recorded in 1974 and released on the Atlantic label.

Track listing
All compositions by Ted Curson
 "Spiderlegs" - 7:50
 "Tears for Dolphy" - 8:12
 "Typical Ted" - 7:21
 "Greasy as a Porkchop" - 5:56
 "Sugar 'n' Spice" - 6:55
 "Quicksand" - 11:50

Personnel
Ted Curson - trumpet, piccolo trumpet
Robin Kenyatta - alto saxophone, soprano saxophone
Nick Brignola - baritone saxophone, tenor saxophone, saxello
Kenny Barron - piano, electric piano
Herb Bushler - bass, electric bass
Albert Heath - drums
Butch Curson - drums, percussion
Lawrence Killian - congas, bell tree
Chicky Johnson - bongos, timbales

References

1976 albums
Atlantic Records albums
Ted Curson albums
Albums produced by Michael Cuscuna